The Victorino Cunha Cup is an annual Angolan basketball tournament held in honour of former Angolan basketball coach Victorino Cunha. The 5th edition (2013), ran from October 22 to 24, and was contested by the top four teams of the 2013 BAI Basket, and played in a round robin system. Recreativo do Libolo ended the tournament undefeated to win its first title.

Schedule

Round 1

Round 2

Round 3

Final standings

Awards

See also
 2013 BAI Basket
 2013 Angola Basketball Cup
 2013 Angola Basketball Super Cup

References

Victorino Cunha Cup seasons
Victorino